{{Infobox comic strip
|image= Spy vs. Spy Logotipe.png
|creator = Antonio Prohías
|current = Peter Kuper(in full color: 1997–present)
|author=
Antonio Prohías(1961–1987)
Duck Edwing(1987–2000; 2002)
Bob Clarke(1987–1993)
George Woodbridge(1993)
Dave Manak(1993–1997; 2002)
|website=
|rss=
|atom=
|status=Ongoing
|first= Mad magazine #60 (Jan. 1961)
|syndicate=
|publisher= DC Entertainment
|genre=Political satirehumor
|rating=
|preceded by=
|followed by=
}}Spy vs. Spy is a wordless comic strip published in Mad magazine.  It features two agents involved in stereotypical and comical espionage activities. One is dressed in white, and the other in black, but they are otherwise identical, and are particularly known for their long, beaklike heads and their white pupils and black sclera. The pair are always at war with each other, using a variety of booby traps to inflict harm on the other. The spies usually alternate between victory and defeat (sometimes both win and both lose) with each new strip. A parody of the political ideologies of the Cold War, the strip was created by Cuban expatriate cartoonist Antonio Prohías, and debuted in Mad #60, dated January 1961. Spy vs. Spy is currently written and drawn by Peter Kuper.

The Spy vs. Spy characters have been featured in such media as video games and an animated television series, and in such merchandise as action figures and trading cards.

Publication history
Prohías was a prolific cartoonist in Cuba known for political satire. He fled to the United States on May 1, 1960, three days before Fidel Castro's government nationalized the last of the Cuban free press. Prohías sought work in his profession and travelled to the offices of Mad magazine in New York City on July 12, 1960. After a successful showing of his work and a prototype cartoon for Spy vs. Spy, Prohías was hired.

Prohías cryptically signed each strip on its first panel with a sequence of Morse code characters that spell "BY PROHIAS". In a 1983 interview with the Miami Herald, Prohías reflected on the success of Spy vs. Spy, stating, "The sweetest revenge has been to turn Fidel's accusation of me as a spy into a moneymaking venture." Prohías was censored by Mad magazine publisher William Gaines on at least one occasion: the strip that eventually appeared in Mad magazine #84 (Jan. 1964) was altered to remove scenes where the spies drink and smoke (Gaines had a strong anti-smoking stance). Prohías evolved his drawing style over the years, making the spies' heads proportionately larger by 1964. In 1965, he began to experiment with not drawing frames on the spies' shades, and this became a consistent trait from late 1966 on, so that the characters' eyes appeared to have no sclera -- just very large pupils, all black except for reflective glints. But when a spy was caught in an explosion, sometimes his fully drawn shades would fly along with other items such as hat, boots and dentures.  In the 1980s, overhanging lips were common. Prohías completed a total of 241 Spy vs. Spy strips for Mad magazine, the last one appearing in #269 (March 1987). After that he drew gag strips for the titles (such as one involving radioactive waste in #287) and wrote several stories for Clarke or Manak to draw, with his last such contribution in #337 (July 1995).

The strips continued, with writer Duck Edwing and artist Bob Clarke creating the majority. Their strips are identifiable by Clarke's drawing style, but signed "'C/e", or "'C/p" in the Prohías-written cases.

Some were largely uncredited, simply being signed "M&S" (MAD 335) or "M&e" (MAD 352).

Peter Kuper took over as writer and artist for the strip with Mad magazine #356 (April 1997). It was later drawn in full color when the magazine changed from a black and white to full color format.

Characters

Black Spy and White Spy (or "Man in Black" and "Man in White") – Wearing wide-brimmed hats and dressed in overcoats, both Spies have long pointed faces. They are identical, except for one being entirely in white and one entirely in black. The Spies were modeled after El Hombre Siniestro ("The Sinister Man"), a character Prohías created in the Cuban magazine Bohemia in 1956. Like the Spies, he wore a wide-brimmed hat and overcoat and had a long, pointed nose. Prohías described the character as someone who "thought nothing of chopping the tails off of dogs, or even the legs off of little girls" and stated he was "born out of the national psychosis of the Cuban people." 'El Hombre Siniestro bears strong resemblance to the Spies—although, instead of fighting against a set rival, he simply does horrible things to anyone he can find.

The cover copy of The All New Mad Secret File on Spy vs. Spy provides early insight to the characters and Prohías' views on the Castro regime and the CIA:

A gag panel in Mad magazine #122 (Oct. 1968) established Black Spy as a member of the "East." He gets trapped by a White Spy, who is guarding the border to the "West." There is otherwise no indication in the series that Black Spy is pro-communist or White Spy is pro-capitalist.

Grey Spy (or "Woman in Grey") – She debuted in Mad magazine #73 (Sept. 1962) (the strip was temporarily renamed Spy vs. Spy vs. Spy). Grey Spy's appearances were sporadic, but she always triumphed by using the infatuations of Black Spy and White Spy to her advantage. Prohías explained, "the lady Spy represented neutrality. She would decide for White Spy or Black Spy, and she also added some balance and variety to the basic 'Spy vs. Spy' formula." Grey Spy's last appearance under Prohías was Mad magazine #99 (Dec. 1965); she did not appear again until 1988, after Bob Clarke and Duck Edwing took over the strip.

Leaders – They are the barrel-chested, medal-decorated bosses of Black Spy and White Spy, who give them tasks and punish them for their failures. The Leaders were phased out when Peter Kuper took over writing and illustrating the strip.

Spin-offs
 A Sunday strip series (39 in total) was released weekly from April 7 to Dec 29, 2002; 2014 in the MAD news, syndicated by Tribune Media Services and featuring Duck Edwing and Dave Manak returning as writer and artist respectively.
 A series of thirteen strips titled Spy vs. Spy Jr. was published in Mad Kids magazine from 2006 to 2009. It depicted the three Spies as children, playing harmless practical jokes on each other. It appeared in every Mad Kids issue.

 Other media 

 Video games based on the strip have been released for the ZX Spectrum, Commodore 64, Atari 8-bit family, Nintendo Entertainment System, Sega Master System, Super Nintendo Entertainment System, Game Boy, and Apple II. In 1997 GT Interactive announced that it would publish a "Spy vs. Spy" game for the PC in early 1998, but it was cancelled.
 A "Spy vs. Spy" board game was released by Milton Bradley in 1986.
 Animated segments of Spy vs. Spy appeared in the unaired 1974 Mad Magazine Television Special, and in the first five seasons of Mad TV  (1995 until 2000) with animation by Klasky Csupo.
 In 2004, the characters were featured in television commercials for the soft drink Mountain Dew.
 "Spy vs. Spy" was a skit in every episode of Cartoon Network's animated series Mad. It ran from September 6, 2010 – December 2, 2013 (there was one skit per episode; in total, there were 103 short skits in 103 episodes), including themed skits depending on the time the episode first aired (i.e. a Christmas or Halloween theme). In the first season, the skits were drawn in styles based on the illustrations by Prohías and Clarke; the second season introduced a new three-dimensional stop-motion animation style - these skits were animated by Stoopid Buddy Stoodios (the team behind Robot Chicken). For the remaining two seasons of the show, the shorts were produced exclusively in stop-motion. The sketches followed the style of the comic, with one spy being outwitted by the other, and many of them adapted actual installments of the comic, like the Mad TV shorts. Both spies claimed victory 51 times each, and one of their feuds resulted in a draw.
In addition, the aforementioned Robot Chicken spoofed Spy vs. Spy twice. In the Season 2 episode "Password: Swordfish", a skit based around the aforementioned Mountain Dew ads sees White Spy attempting to trounce his adversary by hiding a spring-loaded boxing glove in a soda vending machine, only for Black Spy to simply approach him from behind, shoot him dead, and steal his top-secret plans, rather than using a more elaborate counter-plot as seen in the comic strips. The Season 7 episode "Panthropologie" features a short sketch where Black Spy enacts testicular torture on White Spy, a la Casino Royale.
 The characters made an appearance on an episode of Family Guy, "Spies Reminiscent of Us", whereas White Spy revealed at the headquarters of Chevy Chase and Dan Aykroyd that they had settled their differences and started a romantic relationship. White Spy was voiced by Family Guy series creator Seth MacFarlane.
 There is a planned film adaptation that was originally meant to have Ron Howard to direct back in 2011 from a screenplay by John Kamps and Brian Grazer and David Koepp were set to produce but was scrapped. It now has Rawson Marshall Thurber directing and writing the screenplay.
 
Bibliography
 The All New Mad Secret File on Spy vs. Spy (Signet, 1965) – reprinted by Warner Books in 1971, and Watson-Guptill in 2009
 Spy vs. Spy Follow Up File (Signet, 1968) – reprinted by Warner Books in 1971, and Watson-Guptill in 2009
 The Third Mad Dossier of Spy vs. Spy (Warner Books, 1972)
 The Fourth Mad Declassified Papers on Spy vs. Spy (Warner Books, 1974) – reprinted by Watson-Guptill, 2009
 The Fifth Mad Report on Spy vs. Spy (Warner Books, 1978)
 Mad's Big Book of Spy vs. Spy Capers and Other Surprises (Warner Books, 1978)
 The Sixth Mad Case Book on Spy vs. Spy (Warner Books, 1982)
 Prohías' Spy vs. Spy: The Updated Files (Warner Books, 1989)
 Spy vs. Spy: The Updated Files #8 (Warner Books, 1993)
 Spy vs. Spy: The Complete Casebook (Watson-Guptill, 2001) – reprinted by DC Comics, 2011
 Spy vs. Spy: The Joke and Dagger Files (Watson-Guptill, 2007)
 Spy vs. Spy: An Explosive Celebration (Liberty Street, 2015)
 Spy Vs. Spy: The Big Blast (Time Inc. Books, 2016)

Spin-offs
 Amazingly Stupid MAD (MAD Cartoon Network, 2013)
 Spy vs. Spy: Casebook of Craziness'' (MAD Cartoon Network, 2014)

See also

 Peter Kuper

References

External links

Spy vs. Spy at Don Markstein's Toonopedia. Archived from the original on September 14, 2017.

American comic strips
Satirical comics
Mad (magazine)
1961 comics debuts
Spy comics
Fictional secret agents and spies in comics
Fictional rivalries
Cold War fiction
Comic strip duos
Comics characters introduced in 1961
Humor comics
Gag-a-day comics
American comics characters
Comics adapted into video games
Pantomime comics
Male characters in comics